Wayne Dockery (June 27, 1941 – June 11, 2018) was an American jazz double bassist who worked with George Benson, Sonny Fortune, Eddie Henderson, Hal Galper, Archie Shepp, Michael Brecker, and others. He appears on albums from at least 1971, although never as a bandleader. His brother was pianist Sam Dockery. He moved to Paris in the early 90's and died there after a long illness.

Partial Discography
With George Benson
In Concert-Carnegie Hall (CTI, 1975)
With Junior Cook
The Place to Be (SteepleChase, 1988)
With Sonny Fortune
Long Before Our Mothers Cried (Strata-East, 1974)
Awakening (Horizon, 1975)
A Better Understanding (Blue Note, 1995)
With Hal Galper
Reach Out! (SteepleChase, 1976)
Ivory Forest (Enja, 1979)
With Billy Harper
Trying to Make Heaven My Home (MPS, 1979)

References

1941 births
2018 deaths
20th-century African-American musicians
American jazz double-bassists
Male double-bassists
Musicians from Camden, New Jersey
African-American jazz musicians
American male jazz musicians